The 2011 Women's South American Volleyball Club Championship was the third official edition of the women's volleyball tournament, played by four teams over August 5–7, 2011 in José Liberatti Gymnassium in Osasco, Brazil.

Competing clubs

Round-Robyn
The competition system for the tournament was a single Round-Robin system. Each team plays once against each of the 3 remaining teams. Points are accumulated during the whole tournament, and the final ranking is determined by the total points gained.

|}

Matches

|}

Final standing

Individual awards

Most Valuable Player
 Jaqueline Carvalho (Sollys/Nestle)
Best Spiker
 Ivna Marra (Sollys/Nestle)
Best Blocker
 Larissa Gongra (Sollys/Nestle)
Best Server
 Jaqueline Carvalho (Sollys/Nestle)

Best Digger
 Carla Ruz (Universidad Católica)
Best Setter
 Karine Guerra (Sollys/Nestle)
Best Receiver
 Silvana Papini (Sollys/Nestle)
Best Libero
 Camila Brait (Sollys/Nestle)

References

Women's South American Volleyball Club Championship
Women's South American Volleyball Club Championship
2011 in Brazilian sport
International volleyball competitions hosted by Brazil